The World Kabaddi League (WKL) was a professional circle-style Kabaddi league in India, United States, Canada, Pakistan and the United Kingdom. It was the first worldwide circle style kabaddi league.

History 
The league's first season was in 2014; 8 international teams played in 14 cities in 4 different countries. Three of the teams had celebrity owners. The regular season was four months long, and was followed by an elimination tournament that took place in Mohali, Punjab, India, in which the top four teams determined a champion.

The league attempted a comeback in 2016, but had numerous budgetary problems. After a reorganization, the league rebranded itself as the Global Kabaddi League and launched the new version in 2018. The only team to return for the third season was the California Eagles. This version of the league lasted until the final match on November 3, 2018.

Teams

Schedule

Playing technique 

Two teams of seven players face each other in a circle and take turns sending a "raider" into the other team. To win a point, the raider must take a breath, run into the opposing half, tag one member of the opposite team, then return to his home. The raider will have only 30 seconds to touch the opponents and come back to his home. The game is played with 20-minute halves and a five-minute half-time break during which teams exchange sides.

Venues 

The venues of the World Kabaddi League spanned four contries.

WAVE Group Title Sponsor for World Kabaddi League 2014

Sonalika International Official Partner for World Kabaddi League 2014

Li Ning (company) signed on to be the Leagues clothing partner.

Television broadcasters 

Sony SIX has signed on to broadcast the league in India. PTC Punjabi has signed on to broadcast the league around the world.

References 

World Kabaddi League Lanched

Kabaddi competitions
Sports leagues in the United States
Professional sports leagues in the United States
Professional sports leagues in the United Kingdom
Professional sports leagues in Canada
Professional sports leagues in India
Professional sports leagues in Pakistan
Multi-national professional sports leagues